Shtepa is a gender-neutral Slavic surname. Notable people with the surname include:

Aleksandr Shtepa (born 1979), Russian decathlete 
Nelya Shtepa (born 1962), Ukrainian politician

Russian-language surnames